Flowers is an unincorporated community in Warren County, Mississippi. It is located approximately three miles east of Bovina and is part of the Vicksburg Micropolitan Statistical Area. The Ceres Industrial Park, one of many industrial areas in Warren County, is located in Flowers.

References

Unincorporated communities in Mississippi
Unincorporated communities in Warren County, Mississippi